Charles Sloan Teeple (February 10, 1830November 29, 1881) was an American businessman and Republican politician.  He served one term in the Wisconsin State Assembly, representing southwest Walworth County

Biography
Teeple was born on February 10, 1830, in Esperance (village), New York. In 1856, he settled in Darien (town), Wisconsin. He was a merchant by trade. Teeple died in 1881.

Political career
Teeple was a member of the Assembly during the 1876 session. Other positions he held include Postmaster of Darien. He was a Republican.

References

People from Schoharie County, New York
People from Darien, Wisconsin
Businesspeople from Wisconsin
Republican Party members of the Wisconsin State Assembly
Wisconsin postmasters
American merchants
1830 births
1881 deaths
19th-century American politicians
19th-century American businesspeople